James Harkin (8 August 1913 – 1988) was an English professional footballer who played in the Football League for Doncaster Rovers and Mansfield Town.

References

1913 births
1988 deaths
English footballers
Association football midfielders
English Football League players
Denaby United F.C. players
Doncaster Rovers F.C. players
Rotherham United F.C. players
Shrewsbury Town F.C. players
Mansfield Town F.C. players
Gainsborough Trinity F.C. players
Peterborough United F.C. players